Amadeo  (sometimes Latinized as Amadeus; full name: Amedeo Ferdinando Maria di Savoia; 30 May 184518 January 1890) was an Italian prince who reigned as King of Spain from 1870 to 1873. The first and only King of Spain to come from the House of Savoy, he was the second son of Victor Emmanuel II of Italy and was known for most of his life as the Duke of Aosta, the usual title for a second son in the Savoyard dynasty.

He was elected by the Cortes Generales as Spain's monarch in 1870, following the deposition of Isabel II, and was sworn in the following year. Amadeo's reign was fraught with growing republicanism, Carlist rebellions in the north, and the Cuban independence movement. After three tumultuous years in the throne, he abdicated and returned to Italy in 1873, and the First Spanish Republic was declared as a result.

He founded the Aosta branch of Italy's royal House of Savoy, which is junior in agnatic descent to the branch descended from King Umberto I that reigned in Italy until 1900, but senior to the branch of the dukes of Genoa.

Early life and first marriage

Prince Amedeo of Savoy was born in Turin, then part of the Kingdom of Sardinia. He was the third child and second son of King Victor Emmanuel II, who would later become the first King of a unified Italy, and of Archduchess Adelaide of Austria. He was granted the hereditary title of Duke of Aosta from birth.

Entering the Royal Sardinian Army as captain in 1859, he fought through the Third Italian War of Independence in 1866 with the rank of major-general. He led his brigade into action at the Battle of Custoza and was wounded at Monte Croce. In 1868, after his marriage, he was created vice admiral of the Italian Royal Navy, but the position ended when he ascended the Spanish throne.

In 1867, his father yielded to the entreaties of the parliamentary deputy Francesco Cassins, and on 30 May of that year, Amedeo was married to Donna Maria Vittoria dal Pozzo. The King initially opposed the match on the grounds that her family was of insufficient rank and that he hoped for his son to marry a German princess. Despite her princely title, Donna Maria Vittoria was not of royal birth and belonged rather to the Piedmontese nobility. She was, however, the sole heir to her father's vast fortune, which subsequent Dukes of Aosta inherited, and thereby obtaining wealth independent of their dynastic appanage and allowances from Italy's kings. The wedding day of Prince Amedeo and Donna Maria Vittoria was marred by the death of a station master, who was crushed under the wheels of the honeymoon train.

In March 1870, Maria Vittoria appealed to the King to remonstrate with her husband for marital infidelities, which caused her hurt and embarrassment. However, the King wrote in reply that he understood her feelings, but he considered that she had no right to dictate her husband's behaviour, and her jealousy was unbecoming.

King of Spain
 
After the Glorious Revolution deposed Isabella II, the new Cortes decided to reinstate the monarchy under a new dynasty. The Duke of Aosta was by father line, a descendant of King Philip II of Spain through his daughter Infanta Catherine Michelle of Spain and her son Thomas Francis, Prince of Carignano, and, by mother line, a descendant of King Charles III of Spain through his daughter Infanta Maria Luisa of Spain. The Savoyard prince was elected king as Amadeo I on 16 November 1870 and swore to uphold the Constitution in Madrid on 2 January 1871.

The election of the new king coincided with the assassination of General Juan Prim, his chief supporter. Amadeo then had to deal with difficult situations, with unstable Spanish politics, republican conspiracies, Carlist uprisings, separatism in Cuba, interparty disputes, fugitive governments and assassination attempts.

Amadeo could count on the support of only the Progressive Party, whose leaders traded off in the government by its parliamentary majority and electoral fraud. The progressives divided into monarchists and constitutionalists, which worsened the country's instability, and in 1872 a violent outburst of interparty conflicts hit a peak. There was a Carlist uprising in the Basque and Catalan regions, and republican uprisings later occurred in cities across the country. The artillery corps of the army went on strike, and the government instructed Amadeo to discipline them.

Though warned of a plot against his life on 18 August 1872, he refused to take precautions. While returning from Buen Retiro Park to Madrid in company with the queen, he was repeatedly shot at in Vía Avenal. The royal carriage was struck by several revolver and rifle bullets. The horses were wounded, but its occupants escaped unhurt. A period of calm followed that event.

With the possibility of reigning without popular support, Amadeo issued an order against the artillery corps and then immediately abdicated from the Spanish throne on 11 February 1873. At ten o'clock the same night, Spain was proclaimed a republic, and Amadeo made an appearance before the Cortes and proclaimed the Spanish people to be ungovernable.

Later life

Completely disgusted, the ex-monarch left Spain and returned to Italy, where he resumed the title of Duke of Aosta. The First Spanish Republic lasted less than two years, and in November 1874 Alfonso XII, the son of Isabella II, was proclaimed king, with Antonio Cánovas del Castillo, Spanish intermittent prime minister from 1873 until his assassination in 1897, briefly serving as regent.

Amadeo's first wife died in 1876.  In 1888 he married his French niece, Princess Maria Letizia Bonaparte, Duchess of Aosta (20 November 186625 October 1926), daughter of his sister Maria Clotilde and of Prince Napoléon Bonaparte, a nephew of Napoleon I. They had one child, Umberto (1889–1918), who died of the flu during the First World War.

Amadeo remained in Turin, Italy until his death on 18 January 1890. His friend Puccini composed the famous elegy for string quartet Crisantemi in his memory.

Legacy

The municipality of Amadeo, in the province of Cavite, in the Philippines, which was a colony of Spain, was named after Amadeo I when it was established on 15 July 1872, during his reign.A large salt lake, Lake Amadeus, and the subsequently-named Amadeus Basin, where it lies in central Australia, is also named after Amadeo I by the explorer Ernest Giles, who was the first European to find the lake, in 1872.

Honours and arms

National
 :
 Knight of the Supreme Order of the Most Holy Annunciation, 27 September 1862
 Grand Cross of the Order of Saints Maurice and Lazarus, 27 September 1862
 Grand Cross of the Order of the Crown of Italy, 27 September 1862
 Gold Medal of Military Valour, 5 December 1866
 : Grand Cross of the Order of Charles III, with Collar, 28 November 1866

Foreign
   Austria-Hungary: Grand Cross of the Royal Hungarian Order of Saint Stephen, 1875
 : Grand Cordon of the Order of Leopold (civil), 5 September 1863
 : Knight of the Order of the Elephant, 19 August 1863
 : Grand Cordon of the Supreme Order of the Chrysanthemum, 11 September 1882
 : Grand Cross of the Order of Saint-Charles, 27 April 1875
  Kingdom of Prussia:
 Knight of the Order of the Black Eagle, 13 March 1867
 Grand Commander's Cross of the Royal House Order of Hohenzollern, 10 March 1881
 : Knight of the Order of Saint Andrew the Apostle the First-called, 1879
   Sweden-Norway:
 Knight of the Royal Order of the Seraphim, 2 August 1863
 Grand Cross of the Royal Norwegian Order of Saint Olav, 28 December 1872

Arms

Issue
By Maria Vittoria dal Pozzo:
 Prince Emanuele Filiberto, Duke of Aosta (13 January 18694 July 1931) Marshal of Italy married to Princess Hélène of Orléans and had issue, including Prince Aimone who was briefly King Tomislav II of Croatia.
 Prince Vittorio Emanuele, Count of Turin (24 November 187010 October 1946) died unmarried.
 Prince Luigi Amedeo, Duke of the Abruzzi (29 January 187318 March 1933) Vice Admiral in the Italian Royal Navy died unmarried.
By Maria Letizia Bonaparte:
 Umberto, Count of Salemi (22 June 188919 October 1918), died of the Spanish flu during World War I.

Ancestry

References

External links

 Historiaantiqua. Amadeo I; (Spanish) (2008)

|-

|-

1845 births
1890 deaths
19th-century Spanish monarchs
Amadeo I
Nobility from Turin
Spanish captain generals
Captain generals of the Navy
Knights of Santiago
Italian princes
Burials at the Basilica of Superga
Monarchs who abdicated
Knights Grand Cross of the Order of Saints Maurice and Lazarus
Recipients of the Order of the Crown (Italy)
Grand Masters of the Order of the Golden Fleece
Grand Crosses of the Order of Saint Stephen of Hungary
Grand Crosses of the Order of Saint-Charles
Navarrese titular monarchs
People of the Third Carlist War
Victor Emmanuel II of Italy